Ariyankuppam is one of 5 Communes in Pondicherry district in the Indian territory of Puducherry. It is the only commune under Puducherry Taluk. Other communes are under Villianur and Bahour Taluk. Ariyankuppam Commune consists of 2 Census Town and 9 Panchayat Villages.

Ariyankuppam holds two vital tourist spots of Puducherry namely:

 Aricamedu, An Archaeological Site 
 Chunnambar Boat House

Commune wards

References

External links
 Department of Revenue and Disaster Management, Government of Puducherry

Ariyankuppam
Communes of Pondicherry